Candidatus scientiarum (male), or candidata scientiarum (female), abbreviated as cand.scient., is an academic degree currently awarded in Denmark and formerly awarded in Norway.

In Denmark, cand.scient. is a higher-level degree awarded as a Kandidat (Candidate) degree by Danish universities to graduate students in the mathematics and natural sciences. The study requires 120 ECTS, and normally requires two years study in addition to a completed bachelor's degree. The title is officially translated to English as Master of Science.

In Norway, cand.scient. was a higher-level degree awarded in the fields of mathematics and natural sciences. It was introduced in 1985, replacing the more rigorous cand.real. degree. Completion required 1.5–2 years study in addition to a completed cand.mag. degree of 3.5 year. In 2003, the cand.scient. degree was replaced in Norway by the Master of Science degree as part of the adoption of the Bologna Process.

References

Master's degrees
Academic degrees of Denmark
Academic degrees of Norway